Kamilló Szathmáry (11 March 1909 – 21 June 2000) was a Romanian fencer. He competed in the individual and team sabre events at the 1936 Summer Olympics.

References

External links
 

1909 births
2000 deaths
Romanian male fencers
Romanian sabre fencers
Olympic fencers of Romania
Fencers at the 1936 Summer Olympics